Mirdza Zīvere (born 20 September 1953) is a Latvian singer, producer and theatre and opera director.

References

1953 births
Living people
20th-century Latvian women singers
Place of birth missing (living people)